Live at Phoenix Public House Melbourne is a live album by American singer-songwriter Mark Kozelek, released on February 19, 2013 on Caldo Verde Records. Recorded on June 11, 2012, and released on the same day as Kozelek's covers album, Like Rats (2013), the album predominantly features tracks from the then-recently released Sun Kil Moon album, Among the Leaves (2012).

The track, "You Missed My Heart", would subsequently appear on Kozelek's collaborative album with The Album Leaf's Jimmy Lavalle, Perils From The Sea (2013).

Reception

Critical response

Pitchfork Media's Stephen Deusner gave the album a positive review stating, "Live at Phoenix Public House Melbourne may be [Kozelek]'s most substantial live album in ages. It draws heavily from Among the Leaves, and makes a worthy addendum to the studio recording because it places these songs in what sounds like their natural setting: a small club sparsely filled with adoring fans clapping politely even after Kozelek laments the lop-sided male:female ratio."

Track listing

Personnel
Mark Kozelek - vocals, guitar, photographs
Et Cetera - sleeve design

References

2013 live albums
Mark Kozelek albums
Albums produced by Mark Kozelek
Caldo Verde Records albums